In mathematics, the de Franchis theorem is one of a number of closely related statements applying to compact Riemann surfaces, or, more generally, algebraic curves, X and Y, in the case of genus g > 1. The simplest is that the automorphism group of X is finite (see though Hurwitz's automorphisms theorem). More generally, 

the set of non-constant morphisms from X to Y is finite;
fixing X, for all but a finite number of such Y, there is no non-constant morphism from X to Y.

It is sometimes referenced as the De Franchis-Severi theorem. It was used in an important way by Gerd Faltings to prove the Mordell conjecture.

See also
Castelnuovo–de Franchis theorem

References
M. De Franchis: Un teorema sulle involuzioni irrazionali, Rend. Circ. Mat Palermo 36 (1913), 368

Algebraic curves
Riemann surfaces
Theorems in algebraic geometry
Theorems in algebraic topology